Affairs Today was a global student-run online business and politics newspaper aimed at university students around the world. It mainly focused on international political developments and global economics although it also produced career, travel and lifestyle articles. Its principal audience was university students and was mostly read in the United Kingdom. Affairs Today had no particular political inclination as it attempted to be a platform where highly engaged students could voice their opinions regardless of their stance on the matters they wrote about. As such, a wide and diverse range of views could be found on Affairs Today. The thought behind this unusual editorial guideline was that readers would be challenged by the views of their peers and as a result engage with and learn from the articles published on Affairs Today. In terms of style, Affairs Today sought to emulate the journalistic standards of long-established publications such as the Financial Times and The Economist.

Affairs Today was operated by more than 100 staffers based in over 15 different countries around the world. Every member of the staff had to be a university student. As the founders moved on from their studies to their respective careers, they decided to close Affairs Today in March 2017. A part of the editorial staff went on to found a news outlet of their own known as Pynx Media, which was discontinued in 2018.

History
Affairs Today was started in February 2013 by University of Glasgow students Alexandre Gianasso and Maximilian Linhard. However, it is only in November of that year that Affairs Today was formally incorporated. At the date of incorporation, Ferdinand Goetzen had joined the founding team in his capacity of Editor-in-Chief. Affairs Today originally started as a blog operated from a student hall and was chiefly set up as a rival to The Gateway, a newspaper sometimes referred to as the "Student FT". It is during a visit to the University of Edinburgh that Alexandre Gianasso and Maximilan Linhard read a Gateway newspaper for the first time, whereupon they decided that the same could be achieved by students themselves. At the time, most writers for the Gateway were professional journalists. After a difficult first few months of low readership, Affairs Today experienced rapid growth in late 2013 as the original team was expanded and as high-profile interviews added to the credibility of the website, notably Ferdinand Goetzen's interview with King Simeon II of Bulgaria.  The website thereon moved on from its original aim and sought to establish itself as its own brand of 'global student business news'. From that point on, Affairs Today managed to feature more successful interviews with prominent business and political leaders, which further contributed to its expansion. At its peak in 2016, Affairs Today had over 35,000 visitors per month.

Notable Interviews
Affairs Today conducted interviews with important personalities drawn from the business and political world. Here is a non-exhaustive list of the personalities Affairs Today interviewed since 2013

 Tsar Simeon II of Bulgaria
 Didier Reynders, Belgium's Minister of Foreign Affairs and Vice Prime Minister
 Cecilia Malmström, EU Commissioner for Trade
 John Sculley, former PepsiCo President and Apple CEO
 Lord Robertson, former NATO Secretary-General 
 Jaan Tallinn, Co-Founder of Skype
 Brian McBride, Chairman of ASOS.com 
 Kevin Sneader, McKinsey & Company Asia Chairman
 Ahmet Üzümcü, OPCW Director-General and Nobel Prize winner
 Nigel Eccles, Co-Founder and CEO of FanDuel
 Robin Marshall, Managing Director at Bain Capital

Editors-in-Chief
November 2016 - March 2017: Robert Lewis Watson
April 2016 - November 2016: Eimi Harris 
April 2015 - April 2016: Christopher Jackson
September 2014 - April 2015: Ryan McElney 
September 2013 - September 2014: Ferdinand von Götzen

References

External links 
 Affairs Today 

Internet properties established in 2013
Student newspapers
Student newspapers published in the United Kingdom